The 1987–88 Serie A season was the 54th season of the Serie A, the top level of ice hockey in Italy. 10 teams participated in the league, and HC Bozen won the championship by defeating HC Meran in the final.

Regular season

Playoffs

External links
 Season on hockeyarchives.info

1987-88
Italy
Serie